Djinns (also known by the title Stranded) is a 2010 French horror film written and directed by Hugues Martin and Sandra Martin, set during the Algerian War in 1960. It stars Saïd Taghmaoui, Cyril Raffaelli and Aurélien Wiik. The film is about a group of French soldiers who are attacked during a rescue mission by a jinn.

Plot 
Algeria, 1960. A unit of French paratroopers is sent to search for a missing plane in the desert. The wreckage of the plane is quickly located, but there are no survivors, just a briefcase stamped "defense secret." Assaulted by enemy soldiers of the National Liberation Army, the troops then find refuge in a strange citadel which seems abandoned. Despite the guardian's warnings, they wake up the Djinns, the evil spirits of the desert who kill each other on the patrol.

Cast

Production
The French production was shot entirely in Morocco. Nicolas Duvauchelle was originally cast for the project in December 2007 but was replaced by Saïd Taghmaoui as Aroui on 20 January 2009. Djinns was directed and based on a screenplay by Hugues and his wife Sandra. Caroline Adrian, Antoine Rein and Fabrice Goldstein produced for Delante Films.

Release
Djinns was premiered in France on 11 August 2010 and had its French theatrical release on the same day. It was released in the UK in cinemas as Stranded on 31 August 2010. The US release over SND is currently unknown.

Soundtrack
The French electronica musician Siegfried Canto	composed the score.

See also
 Red Sands (2009)

References

External links

2010 films
2010 horror films
French horror films
2010s French-language films
Films set in Africa
Films shot in Morocco
Films set in the 1960s
Films set in Algeria
Algerian War films
Horror war films
Genies in film
2010 directorial debut films
2010s French films